&flix is an Indian English-language movie channel from Zee Entertainment Enterprises. It launched on 3 June 2018, replacing Zee Studio.

History 
Due to poor ratings of Zee Studio, Zee Entertainment Enterprises rebranded the channel as &Flix.

Programming 
Zee linked an exclusive distribution deal with Sony Pictures before the launch. &Flix also shows movies from Walt Disney Studios, Paramount Pictures and Universal Pictures.

See also

 Walt Disney Pictures
 MNC Vision

References

External links 

Television stations in Mumbai
Movie channels in India
Television channels and stations established in 2018
Zee Entertainment Enterprises
English-language television stations in India
2018 establishments in India